Maine School Administrative District 12 (MSAD 12) is an operating school district within Somerset County Maine, covering the towns of Jackman and Moose River.

References 

12
12